Old Concord is an unincorporated community in Washington County, Pennsylvania, United States.

Unincorporated communities in Washington County, Pennsylvania
Unincorporated communities in Pennsylvania